Oleksandr Saliuk Jr. (born July 16, 1978 in Kyiv, in the Ukrainian SSR of the Soviet Union – in present-day Ukraine) is a rally driver from Ukraine. Saliuk won the Ukrainian Rally Championship in 2006, 2007, 2009, 2010 and 2012. In 2011, Saliuk contests in the Production World Rally Championship (PWRC) with the Mentos Ascania Racing Team driving a Mitsubishi Lancer Evo IX. He scored four World Rally Championship points by finishing third on the 2011 Rally Australia.

WRC results

PWRC results

References

External links

1978 births
Living people
World Rally Championship drivers
Ukrainian rally drivers